The T-Mobile National Basketball Association Rookie of the Month Award is presented monthly by the league to honor the top rookie in both conferences (Eastern and Western conferences) in a particular month. Once won, the trophy is presented to the player before his next home game.

Winners

1981–2001

2001–present

See also 
 NBA Rookie of the Year Award
 NBA All-Rookie Team

References

Rookie of the Month Award
National Basketball Association lists
Rookie player awards
1981 establishments in the United States
Awards established in 1981